Michael Gwynn (30 November 1916 – 29 January 1976) was an English actor. He attended Mayfield College near Mayfield, Sussex. During the Second World War he served in East Africa as a major and was adjutant to the 2nd (Nyasaland) Battalion of the King's African Rifles.

Life and career
6ft 3inch tall Gwynn is perhaps best remembered for his role in the first episode of the BBC comedy Fawlty Towers "A Touch of Class" (1975) as the conman "Lord" Melbury who eventually humiliates Basil Fawlty. For Hammer Films, he performed in several productions including the war film The Camp on Blood Island (1958), and Never Take Sweets from a Stranger (1960), a rare drama film for the studio; the actor also appeared in one of their very best horror movies, The Revenge of Frankenstein (1958), in which he played a tragic experimental subject who turns into a cannibalistic killer, and the less well-regarded Scars of Dracula (1970) in the role of a priest determined to battle Count Dracula. He had a lead role in 1960's Village of the Damned, produced and distributed by MGM-British Studios.

Gwynn also appeared on several adaptations of plays on the Caedmon Records label. Among them were Cyrano de Bergerac, in which he played Le Bret, and Julius Caesar, in which he played Casca. Both productions starred Ralph Richardson in the title roles.  Gwynn also appeared in a BBC serialised adaptation of Great Expectations as Joe Gargery in 1959.

Gwynn died on 29 January 1976 in London , aged 59. Earlier that day, he had finished filming on Spawn, a television play for London Weekend Television.

Plays
1956 – A View from the Bridge (opening season) by Arthur Miller; director Peter Brook – Alfieri.

Filmography

1954: The Runaway Bus - 1st Transport Officer
1957: The Secret Place - Steve Waring
1958: Dunkirk - Commander – Sheerness
1958: The Camp on Blood Island – Tom Shields
1958: The Revenge of Frankenstein – Karl
1958: The Doctor's Dilemma – Dr. Blenkinsop
1960: Never Take Sweets from a Stranger – Prosecutor
1960: Village of the Damned – Alan Bernard
1961: Question 7 – Friedrich Gottfried – Pastor
1961: What a Carve Up! – Malcolm Broughton
1961: Barabbas – Lazarus
1962: Some People – Vicar
1963: Cleopatra – Cimber
1963: Jason and the Argonauts – Hermes
1964: The Fall of the Roman Empire – Cornelius
1965: The Saint – Martin Jeffroll
1965: Catch Us If You Can – Hardingford
1966: The Deadly Bees – Dr. George Lang
1967: The Crowning Gift – Jesus Christ
1969: The Virgin Soldiers – Lt. Col. Bromley-Pickering
1969: Randall and Hopkirk (Deceased) – Episode 16 "The Man from Nowhere", as Hyde Watson
1970: Scars of Dracula – Priest
1974: Rooms - 2-part TV episode "Mr Cotgrove & Miss Hicks" - Mr Cotgrove
1976: Spy Story – Dawlish (final film role)

References

External links

1916 births
1976 deaths
British Army personnel of World War II
English male film actors
English male stage actors
English male television actors
King's African Rifles officers
People from Bath, Somerset
20th-century English male actors